Petname systems are naming systems that claim to possess all three naming properties of Zooko's triangle - global, secure, and memorable. Software that uses such a system can satisfy all three requirements. Such systems can be used to enhance security, such as preventing phishing attacks.
Unlike traditional identity systems, which focus on the service provider, Petname systems are decentralized and designed to facilitate the needs of the enduser as they interact with multiple services.

History
Though the Petname model was formally described in 2005 by Mark Stiegler, the potential of the system was discovered by several people successively.

Examples

 The GNU Name System (GNS) – a decentralized alternative to DNS based on the principle of a petname system
 CapDesk – a distributed desktop environment
 Petname Tool (discontinued browser extension) – There was a browser extension available for Firefox called Petname Tool that allowed pet names to be assigned to secure websites. Use of this extension could help prevent phishing attacks.

PetName Markup Language
The PetName Markup Language (PNML) is a proposal for embedding Petname information into other systems using a custom markup language.

PNML consists of two tags:
pet-name-string
stringified-cryptographic-key

References

External links
 Petname Site
 An Introduction to Petname Systems
 The PetName Markup Language
 Petnames: A humane approach to secure, decentralized naming

Computer security software
Secure communication
Free Firefox legacy extensions